The Allerbeeke is a stream of Lower Saxony, Germany. It belongs to the Weser river system in north Germany. With a length of about  it flows through the district of Diepholz.
It rises northeast of the town centre of Sulingen, flows in a southerly direction forming the boundary between Sulingen and Maasen (Siedenburg) and discharges east of Barenburg into the Große Aue.

See also
List of rivers of Lower Saxony

References

Rivers of Lower Saxony
Rivers of Germany